Dujardin is a French surname, meaning "from the garden", and may refer to:

 Charlotte Dujardin, British dressage rider
 Édouard Dujardin, French writer
 Félix Dujardin (1801–1860), French biologist
 Jean Dujardin, French actor and comedian
 Karel Dujardin, Dutch painter
 Marbrianus Dujardin (Marbrianus de Orto), Netherlandish composer
 Paul Dujardin (water polo), French water polo player

See also 
 Jardin (disambiguation)

French-language surnames